Bulbinella is a genus of plants in the family Asphodelaceae, subfamily Asphodeloideae, first described as a genus in 1843. Many species are endemic to Cape Province in western South Africa, confined to the winter rainfall area. Other species are endemic to New Zealand, where they are most common in the central Otago region which enjoys a similar climate to the Cape Region of South Africa.

Description
They are characterised by the presence of a dense terminal raceme of flowers, often yellow but also white, pink, yellow or orange depending on the species. One of the  New Zealand species only species with white and yellow flowers. Each flower occurs in the axil of a bract and has 1 nerved  perianth segments that are almost free. Each flower has 6 stamens.  The seeds are characteristically shield shaped and there are one or two seeds in each chamber.

The plants may grow up to 1 metre in height and have  narrow or thread like  but never succulent leaves. The leaves decay into prominent fibres at the base of the stem, often netted or reticulate in appearance, although this feature is absent from the New Zealand species.  They tend to overwinter and aestivate with wiry or swollen tubers.

Species
 Bulbinella angustifolia (Cockayne & Laing) L.B.Moore - South Island of New Zealand
 Bulbinella barkerae P.L.Perry - Caledon + Bredasdorp in Cape Province of South Africa
 Bulbinella calcicola J.C.Manning & Goldblatt - Cape Province of South Africa
 Bulbinella caudafelis (L.f.) T.Durand & Schinz - Cape Province of South Africa
 Bulbinella chartacea P.L.Perry - Clanwilliam + Worcester in Cape Province of South Africa
 Bulbinella ciliolata Kunth - Namaqualand in Cape Province of South Africa
 Bulbinella divaginata P.L.Perry - Cape Province of South Africa
 Bulbinella eburniflora P.L.Perry - Calvinia in Cape Province of South Africa
 Bulbinella elata P.L.Perry - Cape Province of South Africa
 Bulbinella elegans Schltr. ex P.L.Perry - Cape Province of South Africa
 Bulbinella floribunda (Aiton) T.Durand & Schinz - Yellow Cat-tail - Cape Province of South Africa
 Bulbinella gibbsii Cockayne - North + South Islands of New Zealand
 Bulbinella gracilis Kunth - Cape Province of South Africa
 Bulbinella graminifolia P.L.Perry - Cape Province of South Africa
 Bulbinella hookeri (Colenso ex Hook.) Cheeseman - Maori Lily - North + South Islands of New Zealand
 Bulbinella latifolia Kunth - Cape Province of South Africa
 Bulbinella modesta L.B.Moore - North + South Islands of New Zealand
 Bulbinella nana P.L.Perry - Richtersveld in Cape Province of South Africa
 Bulbinella nutans (Thunb.) T.Durand & Schinz - Cape Province of South Africa
 Bulbinella potbergensis P.L.Perry - Cape Province of South Africa
 Bulbinella punctulata Zahlbr. - Cape Province of South Africa
 Bulbinella rossii (Hook.f.) Cheeseman - Ross Lily - Auckland Islands + Campbell Islands of New Zealand
 Bulbinella talbotii L.B.Moore - Gouland Downs in New Zealand's South Island
 Bulbinella trinervis (Baker) P.L.Perry - Cape Province of South Africa
 Bulbinella triquetra (L.f.) Kunth - Cape Province of South Africa

References

 
Asphodelaceae genera